Sir Brian Frederick James Langstaff (born 30 April 1948), styled The Hon. Mr Justice Langstaff, is former a judge of the High Court of England and Wales.

He was educated at George Heriot's School, Edinburgh, and then at St Catharine's College, Cambridge.

He was called to the bar at the Middle Temple in 1971 and became a bencher there in 2001. He was made a QC in 1994, and was appointed a judge of the High Court of Justice in 2005 and assigned to the Queen's Bench Division. He retired from the High Court in May 2018.

In February 2018 it was announced that he would be the Chair of the Infected Blood Inquiry which became officially established on 2 July 2018. In July 2022, the Inquiry published an interim report and Langstaff concluded that the 4,000 victims were provisionally entitled to £100,000 each and the payments ought to be made quickly.

References

1948 births
Living people
People educated at George Heriot's School
Alumni of St Catharine's College, Cambridge
Members of the Middle Temple
Queen's Bench Division judges
Knights Bachelor